Anilios silvia, also known commonly as the great sandy blind snake or Sylvia's blind snake, is a species of snake in the family Typhlopidae. The species is endemic to northeastern Australia.

Etymology
The specific name, silvia, is in honour of Hannah Sylvia Ingram, the mother of the senior describer of this species. It is also an allusion to Rhea Silvia, who in Roman mythology was the mother of twins Romulus and Remus.

Geographic range
A. silvia is found in the Australian state of Queensland.

Reproduction
A. silvia is oviparous.

References

Further reading
Cogger HG (2014). Reptiles and Amphibians of Australia, Seventh Edition. Clayton, Victoria, Australia: CSIRO Publishing. xxx + 1,033 pp. . (Ramphotyphlops silvia, p. 810).
Hedges SB, Marion AB, Lipp KM, Marin J, Vidal N (2014). "A taxonomic framework for typhlopid snakes from the Caribbean and other regions (Reptilia, Squamata)". Caribbean Herpetology (49): 1-61. (Anilios silvia, new combination).
Ingram GJ, Covcevich JA (1993). "Two new species of striped blindsnakes". Memoirs of the Queensland Museum 34 (1): 181–184. (Ramphotyphlops silvia, new species).
Wallach V (2006). "The Nomenclatural Status of Australian Ramphotyphlops (Serpentes: Typhlopidae)". Bulletin of the Maryland Herpetological Society 42 (1): 8-24. (Austrotyphlops silvia, new combination, p. 13).

silvia
Snakes of Australia
Reptiles of Queensland
Endemic fauna of Australia
Reptiles described in 1993
Taxa named by Jeanette Covacevich